Dunguy is a rural locality (a selo) in Kyakhtinsky District, Republic of Buryatia, Russia. The population was 176 as of 2010. There are 4 streets.

Geography 
Dunguy is located 103 km southeast of Kyakhta (the district's administrative centre) by road. Ulady is the nearest rural locality.

References 

Rural localities in Kyakhtinsky District